is a Japanese sailor. He competed at the 2012 Summer Olympics in the 49er class.

References

1982 births
Living people
Japanese male sailors (sport)
Olympic sailors of Japan
Sailors at the 2012 Summer Olympics – 49er
Sailors at the 2016 Summer Olympics – 49er
People from Yokohama